Conus erythraeensis, common name the Red Sea cone, is a species of sea snail, a marine gastropod mollusk in the family Conidae, the cone snails and their allies.

Like all species within the genus Conus, these snails are predatory and venomous. They are capable of "stinging" humans, therefore live ones should be handled carefully or not at all.

Description
The size of the shell varies between 16 mm and 35 mm. The shell is small, smooth and striate below. It is yellowish white, with revolving rows of quadrangular chestnut spots, sometimes partly clouded over, so as to form bands of chestnut clouds. The spire is maculate.

Distribution
This species occurs in the Red Sea and in the Northwest Indian Ocean.

References

  Petit, R. E. (2009). George Brettingham Sowerby, I, II & III: their conchological publications and molluscan taxa. Zootaxa. 2189: 1–218
 Puillandre N., Duda T.F., Meyer C., Olivera B.M. & Bouchet P. (2015). One, four or 100 genera? A new classification of the cone snails. Journal of Molluscan Studies. 81: 1–23

External links
 The Conus Biodiversity website
 Cone Shells – Knights of the Sea
 

erythraeensis
Gastropods described in 1843